The 2019–20 Moldovan Women's Cup was the 23rd season of the Moldovan annual football tournament. The competition started on 17 November 2019 and concluded with the final held on 19 August 2020. A total of eight teams had their entries to the tournament.

Quarter-finals

First legs

Second legs

Semi-finals

First legs

Second legs

Final

The final was played on 19 August 2020 at the Zimbru Stadium in Chișinău.

Notes

References

Moldovan Women's Cup seasons
Moldovan Women's Cup 2019-20
Moldova